Álvaro Burgos Barrera (born 22 January 1962) is a Mexican politician affiliated with the Institutional Revolutionary Party. As of 2014 he served as Deputy of the LIX Legislature of the Mexican Congress representing Guerrero.

References

1962 births
Living people
Politicians from Guerrero
People from Taxco
Institutional Revolutionary Party politicians
Members of the Congress of Guerrero
21st-century Mexican politicians
Deputies of the LIX Legislature of Mexico
Members of the Chamber of Deputies (Mexico) for Guerrero